The fifth power is a term, apparently created by Ignacio Ramonet, that intends a continuation of the series of the three estates of the realm and the fourth power, the mass media. The term fifth power can be used to refer either to the Internet, public opinion, the Church (which is the First Estate by the original meaning), economic systems or simply money including its creation.

Economic systems
If, by the fifth power, what is meant is the economic system, it refers to the power that government exerts in the economic sphere through public companies and the mechanism of economic intervention, which is fundamentally financial. Historically, the relationship between power and economy has been defined within a narrow scope, primarily as the mercantilism of the Modern Age. However, since the U.S. stock market crash of 1929, four contemporary positions have emerged:

Capitalism advocates a minimum or subsidiary state restricted to legislation which aids the effective function of the free market. This system, first proposed by Adam Smith, has gained ground in the spirit of globalization prevalent since the fall of the Berlin Wall.
Social democracy advocates government regulation of private enterprise and control over private competition, fair trade, progressive taxation, and public funding for government-subsidized programs. In this system, strategic sectors such as transportation, energy, and the military, can be controlled by the public sector.
Fascism advocates a central, authoritarian style of economic intervention which is commonly defined as corporatism.
Socialism advocates common ownership and control of the means of production by the workers and of property in general and the construction of a planned economy.

Monetary systems and money
A fifth power could refer to the influence money can have in blurring the separation of powers, influencing the decisions of a government and legislation, and misapplication of the principle of equality before law.

It can also refer to monetary systems and in the processes involved in the creating of money, the way money is supplied and how the economy is financed. This aspect can be a subject of concern in considering that the processes can introduce an unfair bias. Movements and theories that propose changes to monetary systems are encompassed in the subject of monetary reform.

Internet
A second candidate for the "Fifth Power" is the Internet, which represents a new sort of social mass medium which cannot be included within the narrower, one-way scope of the media of the fourth power. If considered as the fifth branch of power, it is the only one to be controlled by society itself without regulation by the state.

According to Ramonet, Internet users collaborate to form a powerful engine of debate and democratic action. With globalization, the 21st century has the potential to finally bring communication and information to all people. The Time's "person of the year" 2006 ("You") carries the same message.

Church
Another strong candidate for the "Fifth Power" title is the church, because of the concept of separation of church and state. This concept has been adopted in a number of countries, to varying degrees depending on the applicable legal structures and prevalent views toward the proper role of religion in society. This concept of separating the power of the Church from the other three powers of the state is much older than the concepts of power of Economy or power of the Internet.
Note that the church was one of the original three estates of the realm.

See also
Constitutional economics
Political media
Web 2.0
Netizen
Fifth estate

References

External links
Bloggers' Universe Malaysia, BUM2008

Political science terminology
Internet culture